This is a list of submarines of the United States Navy, listed by hull number and by name.

List

See also 
 Submarines in the United States Navy
 List of current ships of the United States Navy
 List of lost United States submarines
 List of most successful American submarines in World War II
 Allied submarines in the Pacific War
 List of pre-Holland submarines
 List of submarine classes of the United States Navy
 List of Gato class submarines
 List of Sturgeon class submarines
 List of Balao class submarines
 List of Tench class submarines
 List of Los Angeles class submarines
 List of submarines of World War II
 List of US Navy ships sunk or damaged in action during World War II § Submarine (SS)
 The NR-1 Deep Submergence Craft was a non-commissioned nuclear submarine operated by the United States Navy.
 Turtle, an American submarine of the American Revolutionary War
 H. L. Hunley, a human-powered submarine of the American Civil War in the early 1860s, operated by the Confederate States Army.
 The United States Navy operated several captured U-boats for publicity and testing purposes. Some were commissioned into the Navy.
 Naval Submarine Medical Research Laboratory

References

External links 
Museum ships
 USS Albacore (AGSS-569), Portsmouth, NH
 USS Batfish (SS-310) - Muskogee War Memorial Museum, Muskogee, OK
 USS Becuna (SS-319) - Independence Seaport Museum, Philadelphia, PA
 USS Blueback (SS-581) - Oregon Museum of Science and Industry, Portland, OR
 USS Bowfin (SS-287) - USS Bowfin Submarine Museum & Park, Pearl Harbor, HI
 USS Cavalla (SSK-244) - Galveston Naval Museum, Galveston, TX
 USS Cobia (SS-245) - Wisconsin Maritime Museum, Manitowoc, WI
 USS Cod (SS-224), Cleveland, OH
 USS Croaker (SSK-246) - Buffalo and Erie County Naval & Military Park, Buffalo, NY
 USS Dolphin (AGSS-555) - Maritime Museum of San Diego, San Diego, CA
 USS Drum (SS-228) - Battleship Memorial Park, Mobile, AL
 USS Growler (SSG-577) - Intrepid Sea, Air & Space Museum, New York, NY
 USS Ling (SS-297) - New Jersey Naval Museum (defunct), Hackensack, NJ
 USS Lionfish (SS-298) - Battleship Cove, Fall River, MA
 USS Marlin (SST-2) - Freedom Park, Omaha, NE
 USS Nautilus (SSN-571) - Submarine Force Library and Museum, Groton, CT
 USS Pampanito (SS-383) - San Francisco Maritime National Park Association, San Francisco, CA
 USS Razorback (SS-394) - Arkansas Inland Maritime Museum, North Little Rock, AR
 USS Requin (SS-481) - Carnegie Science Center, Pittsburgh, PA
 USS Silversides (SS-236) - USS Silversides Submarine Museum, Muskegon, MI
 USS Tang (SS-563) - İnciraltı Sea Museum, İzmir, Turkey
 USS Thornback (SS-418) - Rahmi M. Koç Museum, Istanbul, Turkey
 USS Torsk (SS-423) - Historic Ships in Baltimore, Baltimore, MD
 X-1 - Submarine Force Library and Museum, Groton, CT

 
Submarines
United States
Submarines list